Lai Teck (real name Phạm Văn Đắc; 1901–1947) was a leader of the Communist Party of Malaya and Malayan People's Anti-Japanese Army. A person of mixed Sino-Vietnamese descent, prior to his arrival in Malaya, Lai Teck was believed to have led his life as Truong Phuoc Dat until 1934, during which Dat disappeared and Lai Teck appeared.

Biography 
Lai Teck was a shadowy character whose real name and background are unknown. He was believed to be born under the name of Hoang A Nhac or Phạm Văn Đắc in the Bà Rịa (now Bà Rịa–Vũng Tàu province) in 1901. According to his successor Chin Peng, He curiously chose the party alias 'Wright' which, given the Chinese pronunciation of English words beginning with the letter 'r' soon became distorted to Lai Te. This was further mangled, depending on who was writing or speaking English, to 'Loi Teck', 'Lai Teck' and 'Lighter'.

Lai Teck was believed to have served the French as a spy in Indochina but been uncovered. It was subsequently alleged that he was recruited by the British security services and brought to Singapore in 1934 to infiltrate the Communist Party of Malaya. At this he was highly successful, and by using the British  police to pick off his rivals within the Party he rose through the hierarchy and attained the Communist Party of Malaya leadership as its secretary general in April 1939. Perhaps because of this, he steered the Party on a course of non-confrontation with the British and wholly embraced the Communist International's new line of co-operation with the United States and the Western European powers against Nazi Germany and Japan.

Although many of the CPM's top personnel managed to flee Singapore before it fell, Lai Teck did not and was picked up in a Japanese sweep shortly after in early March 1942. Although most communists were executed by the Japanese, Lai Teck walked free a few days later. Based on later evidence, including documents in Japanese archives, it now appears most likely that Lai Teck saved his life by promising to act as a Japanese agent.

In August 1942 Lai Teck arranged for a full meeting which included the CPM's Central Executive Committee, state party officials, and a group leaders of the MPAJA to be held at the Batu Caves, about ten miles north from Kuala Lumpur. On 1 September 1942, more than 100 senior CPM and MPAJA members gathered at a small village near the Caves for a secret conference, the Japanese staged a surprise raid at dawn. In the ensuing lopsided skirmish most of the CPM and MPAJA high command were destroyed. Lai Teck, who should have been at the meeting, wasn't. Subsequently, he claimed that he had been unable to attend because his car broke down.

Disappearance 

In 1946, faint rumours which had been circulating within the party about disloyalty on the part of Lai Teck began to receive more substantiation. This was exacerbated by the restlessness of the rank and file, especially the younger members, who favoured radical action. Lai Teck was removed from some sensitive posts, and an investigation was begun into his activities. A full meeting of the Central Executive Committee was scheduled for 6 March 1947 at which the complaints against Lai Teck were to be aired in his presence.  Lai Teck did not attend but instead absconded with the bulk of the Party's funds, hiding first in Singapore, then going to Hong Kong and later to Thailand.

Aftermath 
With Lai Teck gone, the party elected a new leader, Chin Peng. According to Chin Peng, he personally went to Bangkok and Hong Kong in 1947, contacted the communist party organizations there and asked them to help him to track down and kill Lai Teck; both the Vietnamese and Thai communists assisted Chin Peng in the manhunt; and eventually, Chin Peng was told by the Thai Communist leader that Lai Teck was accidentally killed in Bangkok some time when three Thai Communists tried to capture him. Reportedly, Lai Teck was suffocated during the struggle, after which his body was put into a gunny sack and tossed into the Menam River.

See also 
List of people who disappeared

References 

1901 births
1940s missing person cases
1947 deaths
British Malaya military personnel of World War II
Hoa people
Malaysian communists
Malaysian people of Hoa descent
Malaysian politicians
Missing people
Lai Teck
Vietnamese spies
World War II resistance members